Douglas C. Oldershaw (July 6, 1915 – October 30, 1995) was an  American football guard and end who played professionally in the National Football League (NFL) for three seasons with the New York Giants. Oldershaw played college football at Santa Barbara State College (now known as the University of California, Santa Barbara). In 1942, he was hired an assistant football coach at the United States Military Academy to serve under head coach Earl Blaik.

References

External links
 

1915 births
1995 deaths
American football ends
American football guards
Army Black Knights football coaches
New York Giants players
UC Santa Barbara Gauchos football players
Coaches of American football from California
Players of American football from Bakersfield, California